Tiziano Tulissi (born 21 July 1997) is an Italian footballer who plays as a forward for  club Fermana on loan from Modena.

Club career
He made his Serie C debut for Modena on 3 September 2016 in a game against FeralpiSalò.

On 7 August 2019, he returned to Modena on another loan. On 22 August 2020, Modena bought out his rights on a permanent basis. On 31 August 2021, he was loaned to Virtus Francavilla. On 13 August 2022, Tulissi moved on loan to Fermana.

References

External links
 

1997 births
Living people
Footballers from Bergamo
Italian footballers
Association football forwards
Serie C players
Atalanta B.C. players
Modena F.C. players
Piacenza Calcio 1919 players
Reggina 1914 players
Virtus Francavilla Calcio players
Fermana F.C. players
Italy youth international footballers